Rapid River Township is the name of two townships in the United States:
Rapid River Township, Michigan
Rapid River Township, Lake of the Woods County, Minnesota

See also
Rapid River (disambiguation)

Township name disambiguation pages